The Dutch Eerste Divisie for the 1961/1962 season was contested by 36 teams. It was the last time the Eerste Divisie was divided into two groups, as next season there would only be one division of sixteen teams: this meant that many teams were relegated to the Tweede Divisie. Heracles won the championship after a play-off against Fortuna Vlaardingen and were promoted to the Eredivisie.

New entrants and group changes

Group A
Promoted from the 1960–61 Tweede Divisie:
 HFC Haarlem
Relegated from the 1960–61 Eredivisie:
 Alkmaar '54
Entered from the B-group:
 DHC
 FC Eindhoven
 Go Ahead
 't Gooi
 VV Helmond
 Sittardia
 SVV

Group B
Promoted from the 1960–61 Tweede Divisie:
 FC Hilversum
 RKVV Wilhelmina
Relegated from the 1960–61 Eredivisie:
 Elinkwijk
 TSV NOAD
Entered from the A-group:
 Enschedese Boys
 Hermes DVS
 Hollandia Victoria Combinatie
 Limburgia
 RBC

Final Tables

Group A

Group B

Play-offs

Promotion play-off

Heracles promoted to Eredivisie.

Relegation play-off

SVV relegated to Tweede Divisie.

See also
 1961–62 Eredivisie
 1961–62 Tweede Divisie

References
Netherlands - List of final tables (RSSSF)

Eerste Divisie seasons
2
Neth